Taiwani is a genus of moths of the family Erebidae erected by Michael Fibiger in 2008.

Species
Taiwani yoshimotoi Fibiger, 2008
Taiwani imperator Fibiger, 2008
Taiwani albipuncta (Wileman, 1915)
Taiwani bialbipuncta Fibiger, 2008

References

Micronoctuini
Moth genera